Manny Pacquiao vs. Juan Manuel Márquez III, was a boxing championship bout for the WBO welterweight  title at a catchweight of 144 lbs. The bout took place on November 12, 2011, at the MGM Grand in Las Vegas, Nevada and was distributed by HBO PPV. The fight also marked a return to HBO for Pacquiao and drew 1.4 million pay-per-view buys.

Build-up
Pacquiao and Marquez had previously faced each other twice. Their first meeting, on May 8, 2004, at the MGM Grand, ended in a draw. They fought again on March 15, 2008, at the Mandalay Bay, where Pacquiao won via a split decision. Both encounters were shrouded in dispute with regards to who won and this subsequently led to a rubber match between the two fighters where Freddie Roach, Pacquiao's trainer, said that he wanted to leave "all doubt behind."

CNN broadcast HBO's 24/7 on free cable and in addition to the HBO Deal, Pacquiao-Marquez III was promoted during the Major League Baseball playoffs on TBS. A four-city press tour covering an estimated 25,000 miles across three countries started on September 3 in Pacquiao's adopted hometown of Manila and ended on September 8 in Mexico City. The bout marked the second time Marquez jumped from Lightweight to Welterweight. His first attempt was a September 2009 loss to Floyd Mayweather Jr., who was making his return to boxing.

National anthem singers
Philippines (Lupang Hinirang) – Maria Aragon
Mexico (Himno Nacional Mexicano) – Cristian Castro
USA (The Star-Spangled Banner) – Thia Megia

Entrance performers
Like what was done before with Manny Pacquiao's previous fight against Shane Mosley, Jimi Jamison, the former lead vocalist of the band Survivor, sang "Eye of the Tiger" as Pacquiao approached the ring.

"No me se rajar" was the mariachi song that accompanied Juan Manuel Marquez during his entrance. It was performed by Raul Sandoval, a popular Mexican mariachi singer.

Judges
Robert Hoyle
Dave Moretti
Glenn Trowbridge

Controversy 
Even though Pacquiao won a close decision, Marquez's fans in the audience believed that Marquez had won the fight. Some of the audience reacted to the decision by hurling food, beer, and ice; a can of beer hit a ringside writer, though no record of any injuries exists. The Ring, which produces its own version of boxing's lineal championships, scored the bout in different ways: its editor, Michael Rosenthal, scored the bout 115–113 for Pacquiao; two of its writers, Lem Satterfield and Mike Koppinger, scored the bout for Marquez 117–111 respectively. Another writer – Doug Fischer, scored the bout a draw. Some Filipino TV news networks and their internet news websites showed photos of Marquez stepping on Pacquiao’s foot six times. However, such occurrences are common between orthodox and southpaw fighters as they attempt to keep their lead foot on the outside of their opponent's. Freddie Roach has addressed the Juan Manuel Marquez "foot-stomping" issue that has become a much discussed topic among Manny Pacquiao fans; he understands that when southpaws and orthodox fight, feet will inevitably collide. According to Compubox, Marquez was outlanded an average of 3 punches per round (14 to 11 punches landed). Pacquiao also threw 142 punches more than Marquez and landed 38 more punches, connecting at a higher percentage rate in power shots. Though in jabs, Marquez turned out to be the one landing at a higher rate, despite being outlanded 59 to 38.

Main card
Welterweight Championship bout:  Manny Pacquiao vs.  Juan Manuel Márquez
Pacquiao defeats Márquez via Majority Decision. (114–114, 115–113, 116–112)
Light Welterweight Championship bout:  Timothy Bradley  vs.  Joel Casamayor
Bradley defeats Casamayor via technical knockout at 2:59 of the eight round.
Light Welterweight bout:  Mike Alvarado vs.  Breidis Prescott
Alvarado defeats Prescott via technical knockout at 1:53 of the tenth round.
Super Featherweight bout:  Juan Carlos Burgos vs.  Luis Cruz
Burgos defeats Cruz via Majority Decision. (92–98, 95–95, 93–97)

Preliminary card
Super Lightweight bout:  José Benavidez vs.  Samuel Santana
Benavidez defeats Santana via Unanimous Decision. (60–50, 60–50, 60–50)
Featherweight bout:  Victor Pasillas vs.  Jose Garcia
Pasillas defeats Garcia via Unanimous Decision. (40–36, 40–36, 40–36)
Welterweight bout:  Dennis Laurente vs.  Ayi Bruce
Laurente defeats Bruce via knockout at 0:57 of the seventh round.
Super Flyweight bout:  Fernando Lumacad vs.  Joseph Rios
Lumacad defeats Rios via Unanimous Decision. (74–77, 73–77, 72–78)

Main event scorecards

Reported fight earnings
Manny Pacquiao guaranteed $22 million vs. Juan Manuel Márquez $5 million
Timothy Bradley $1,025,000 vs. Joel Casamayor $100,000
Mike Alvarado $75,000 vs. Breidis Prescott $35,000
Luis Cruz $35,000 vs. Juan Carlos Burgos $22,500

International broadcasting

Notes

External links
 
Pacquiao vs. Márquez Official Fight Card from BoxRec

Marquez
2011 in boxing
Boxing in Las Vegas
2011 in sports in Nevada
Boxing on HBO
November 2011 sports events in the United States
MGM Grand Garden Arena